In the early 2020s, an ongoing outbreak of avian influenza subtype H5N8 has been occurring at poultry farms and among wild bird populations in several countries and continents, leading to the subsequent cullings of millions of birds to prevent a pandemic similar to that of the H5N1 outbreak in 2008. The first case of human transmission of avian flu, also known as bird flu, was reported by Russian authorities in February 2021, as several poultry farm workers tested positive for the virus.

Outbreak

Early outbreak in Saudi Arabia
On 4 February 2020, the Saudi Arabian government reported an outbreak of the highly pathogenic H5N8 virus on a poultry farm. The outbreak, which occurred in the central Sudair region, killed more than 22,000 birds in a few weeks.

H5N8 spreads to Russia and Central Asia
In the summer months, H5N8 was detected in wild birds in western Russia and Kazakhstan. Because this included waterbirds that migrate into northern and western Europe, it was considered likely that the virus would be detected there later in the year (as would be confirmed in October–November).

International spread in late 2020 and early 2021
On October 22, the agriculture minister Carola Schouten of the Netherlands confirmed that H5N8 had been found in samples from wild birds in the country. As a countermeasure, it was required that birds in poultry farms were kept indoors and isolated. From late October to mid-November, it had spread to three chicken farms and a duck farm in the country, and the 320,000 birds in the farms had been eradicated to stop the spread. Shortly after the first detection in the Netherlands, it was confirmed in the United Kingdom (October: poultry; November: wild birds and poultry), Germany (October: wild birds; November: wild birds and poultry), Republic of Ireland (October and November: wild birds), Belgium (November: wild birds), Denmark (November: wild birds and poultry), France (November: poultry) and Sweden (November: poultry). These outbreaks resulted in countermeasures that were similar to those already taken in the Netherlands.

According to official confirmed reports from the Ministry of Agriculture Forestry and Fisheries of Japan, multiple dead chickens were found in 49 poultry farms: 16 on Shikoku Island, 15 on Kyushu Island, ten in Kanto region, five in western Honshu, one each on Awaji Island, Gifu Prefecture and Toyama Prefecture, Japan from November 5, 2020, to February 25, 2021. According to a local official confirmed the report, these cases were the highly pathogenic H5N8 type flu.

On November 10, South Korea's agriculture ministry said it had confirmed the highly pathogenic H5N8 strain of bird flu in samples from wild birds in the central west of the country and issued its bird flu warning.

On November 27, China's agriculture ministry reported that H5N8 had been found in wild swans in Shanxi province, while Norway detected its first case of the highly pathogenic H5N8 strain of bird flu in wild geese in Sandnes municipality, prompting the Norwegian Food Safety Authority to introduce a regional ban on outdoor poultry.

On November 30, South Korea reported an outbreak of pathogenic H5N8 avian influenza at a farm in Jeongeup, North Jeolla Province, killing over 19,000 ducks.

2021 outbreaks
The H5N8 avian influenza was reported in two districts of Indian state of Kerala in early January 2021 which killed hundreds of birds in late December 2020. Thousands of birds were culled. Avian influenza outbreaks of unknown subtypes were later also reported in five other states of India. 160,000 birds in two poultry farms in Barwala, Panchkula and Raipur Rani are to be culled. 437,000 birds died in this poultry belt between mid-December and 8 January 2021. By 9 January 2021, seven states confirmed the outbreak.

On January 15, authorities in Namibia suspended the importation and transit of poultry from European countries where an outbreak of the Avian influenza subtype H5N8 has been reported.

On January 20, Iraq reported an outbreak of highly pathogenic H5N8 bird flu on a farm in the city of Samarra, which killed 63,700 birds out of the 68,800-strong flock, according to the Paris-based World Organisation for Animal Health (OIE). The remaining birds were subsequently culled.

On February 1, the Ministry of Agriculture and Rural Affairs of China reported an outbreak of highly pathogenic H5N8 in wild Swans at the Winter Palace, Beijing.

On February 2, authorities in Brandenburg, Germany, culled 14,000 turkeys on a farm due to a confirmed outbreak of H5N8 in the Uckermark area.

On February 9, Algeria reported an outbreak of H5N8 on a poultry farm in the town of Aïn Fakroun. The outbreak killed 50,000 birds, with the remaining 1,200 birds in the flock being culled, according to a report from the Agriculture Ministry.

Afghanistan reported an outbreak of H5N8 bird flu on a poultry farm in Herat Province on February 25. The outbreak killed 794 birds, while the remaining 22,000-strong flock were subsequently culled, according to the World Organisation for Animal Health.

Warwickshire, UK reported an outbreak on November 8, 2021. A 3 km protection zone and a 10 km surveillance zone have been established.

Avian flu was detected at a poultry farm in Akita Prefecture in northeastern Japan, prompting the culling of roughly 143,000 chickens, according to the prefectural government on November 10, 2021.

2022 outbreaks

From February to April 2022, avian flu outbreaks in United States have resulted in the culling of more than 22.8 million birds in 24 states.

Avian flu has affected England. In Norfolk, Suffolk and parts of Essex, poultry has been mandated to be kept indoors after the affected areas were placed in an Avian Influenza Prevention Zone.

In October 2022, wildlife experts patrolling the Norfolk Broads were looking for swans that showed signs of being ill and had to euthanatize them on the spot.

2023 outbreaks
In the beginning of the year, an outbreak of H5N8 began in Argentina. In February 2023, Argentina confirmed its first poultry case in Río Negro Province and decided to suspend poultry exports due to the case. By that date, other 25 cases had been detected in wild birds across the country.

Human cases confirmed
On 20 February 2021, Russian authorities reported the first known human cases of H5N8 as seven farm workers tested positive. There is no evidence of human-to-human transmission and the cases were described as "mild" or asymptomatic. The World Health Organization was notified.

See also

 2015 United States H5N2 outbreak
 2008 H5N1 outbreak in West Bengal
 2007 Bernard Matthews H5N1 outbreak
 2006 H5N1 outbreak in India

References

External links
 Avian influenza (bird flu) gov.uk

2020s disease outbreaks
Avian influenza
Influenza outbreaks
Epidemics in India